Bethlehem Township is a township in Northampton County, Pennsylvania, United States. The population of Bethlehem Township was 23,730 at the 2010 census. It is a suburb of Bethlehem and is part of the Lehigh Valley metropolitan statistical area, which had a population of 861,899 and was the 68th most populous metropolitan area in the U.S. as of the 2020 census.

Geography
It is drained by the Lehigh River, which separates it from Lower Saucon Township. Its villages include Brodhead, Butztown, Farmersville, Middletown, Prospect Park (also in Palmer Township), and Wagnerville.

Neighboring municipalities
Lower Saucon Township (south)
Easton (southeast)
Palmer Township (east)
Lower Nazareth Township (north)
Hanover Township (west)
Bethlehem (southwest)
Freemansburg (southwest)

Climate
Bethlehem Township has a hot-summer humid continental climate (Dfa) and the hardiness zone is 6b. Average monthly temperatures in Farmersville range from 28.8 °F in January to 73.8 °F in July.

History 
The ancient Lenni Lenape or Delaware First Nation peoples lived in the Lehigh River valley. The Lehigh River and its Monocacy Creek and Nancy Run tributaries, provided fertile soil and ample fishing opportunities for the area's inhabitants before the arrival of William Penn, newly named "Proprietor" of the Province of Pennsylvania in 1681. In 1737, Penn's family negotiated a land purchase from the Lenape, known as the Walking Purchase. From this agreement, settlement began by Europeans newly arrived in pre-Revolutionary War Pennsylvania.

The municipality of Bethlehem Township was formed in 1746 as a part of Bucks County. The name of Bethlehem itself originated from the German Moravian Brethren on Christmas Eve in 1741. The township, as originally defined, contained the current township as well as the townships of Upper Nazareth and Lower Nazareth. As shown on a page from the 1874 "Atlas of Northampton County", Upper and Lower Nazareth Townships had been created, but the then-borough of Bethlehem had not yet annexed the areas of Altona and parcels along Center Street (Bath Pike), Linden Street (Nazareth Pike), and Easton Avenue.

Demographics

As of the census of 2000, there were 21,171 people, 7,619 households, and 5,889 families residing in the township.  The population density was 1,451.7 people per square mile (560.6/km2).  There were 7,831 housing units at an average density of 537.0/sq mi (207.4/km2).  The racial makeup of the township was 93.27% White, 2.44% African American, 0.07% Native American, 2.20% Asian, 0.01% Pacific Islander, 1.14% from other races, and 0.87% from two or more races. Hispanic or Latino of any race were 3.97% of the population.

There were 7,619 households, out of which 36.2% had children under the age of 18 living with them, 67.4% were married couples living together, 7.4% had a female householder with no husband present, and 22.7% were non-families. 19.2% of all households were made up of individuals, and 8.9% had someone living alone who was 65 years of age or older.  The average household size was 2.69 and the average family size was 3.09.

In the township, the population was spread out, with 25.1% under the age of 18, 6.4% from 18 to 24, 28.1% from 25 to 44, 25.5% from 45 to 64, and 14.8% who were 65 years of age or older.  The median age was 40 years. For every 100 females there were 93.1 males.  For every 100 females age 18 and over, there were 89.5 males. The median income for a household in the township was $60,317, and the median income for a family was $68,427. Males had a median income of $47,363 versus $32,136 for females. The per capita income for the township was $25,141.  About 2.2% of families and 2.7% of the population were below the poverty line, including 2.6% of those under age 18 and 4.2% of those age 65 or over.

Transportation

U.S. Route 22 and Pennsylvania Route 33 are the main highways serving Bethlehem Township. US 22 follows the Lehigh Valley Thruway along an east-west alignment across the northern part of the township, while PA 33 follows a north-south alignment across the eastern part of the township. The southern terminus of Pennsylvania Route 191 is at US 22 in the northwestern portion of the township, from which it heads north along Nazareth Pike. Other major roads include William Penn Highway and Freemansburg Road, both following east-to-west alignments, with Butztown Road/Hecktown Road, Farmersville Road, and the Main Street Extension all following north-to-south alignments.

Education

Public education

Bethlehem Township is part of the Bethlehem Area School District, which maintains two large public high schools, Freedom High School and Liberty High School. Students in grades nine through 12 attend Freedom High School in the township.

The school district also maintains four middle schools and sixteen elementary schools. Four parochial schools also exist in the area: Notre Dame High School in Easton and Bethlehem Christian School, Moravian Academy, and Our Lady of Pepetual Help, all located in Bethlehem.

Community college
Northampton Community College, Bethlehem Township

Police
, there were 35 full-time officers on the local police force. Police personnel earned 15 of the township's top 20 salaries in 2006 with the highest-paid officer grossing nearly $78,000, according to figures released by the township in 2007.

Emergency services
Bethlehem Township is served by two volunteer fire departments, Bethlehem Township and Nancy Run Fire Companies. Bethlehem Township Volunteer Fire Company Station 17, houses two Engines, one Heavy Rescue, two Utility Vehicles, two ATVs, two Brush Units, Rescue Boat and two command vehicles. This station also provides Emergency Medical Services and offers BLS and ALS capabilities to the township, its fleet consists of six ALS ambulances, rehab trailer and supervisors QRS vehicle. Nancy Run Fire Company Station 14, houses three Engines, one Truck (100 ft.) Tower Ladder, one Utility Truck, one Light and Air Truck, and two Command Vehicles. Both departments average more than 900 fire calls annually making them the busiest volunteer fire companies in Northampton county.

Parks and recreation 
Bethlehem Township's parks system provides recreation opportunities for its residents through a series of parks, trail systems, and greenways. The two largest parks, Municipal Park on Farmersville Road in the center of the township and the Janet Johnston Housenick and William D. Housenick Memorial Park on Christian Spring Road in the northwestern corner of the township, provide dozens of acres of green space. Municipal Park features a modern recreation facility with tennis and basketball courts, a fitness trail, hardball and softball fields, and other modern amenities. In contrast, the Housenick Park property consists of conserved lands which formed part of the Camel's Hump Farm property of Archibald Johnston, the first mayor of the consolidated city of Bethlehem.

Complementing the active and passive park facilities in the township is the Palmer/Bethlehem Rail Trail, a  bicycle and walking trail near the north bank of the Lehigh River linking the county seat of Easton to the east with the city of Bethlehem, the largest municipality in the county.

Notes

External links

Official township website

Townships in Northampton County, Pennsylvania
Townships in Pennsylvania